The Airman's Medal (AmnM) is a military award and decoration of the United States Air Force and United States Space Force for personnel who distinguish themselves by heroism involving voluntary risk of their life not involving actual combat with an armed enemy of the United States. The medal was established on 6 July 1960 and is awarded to those service members or those of a friendly nation who, while serving in any capacity with the U.S. Air Force or U.S. Space Force. The performance must have involved personal hazard or danger.

The Airman's Medal was authorized on 10 August 1956 to replace the U.S. Army's Soldier's Medal which had also been awarded to qualifying Air Force personnel since 26 September 1947. According to Air Force Instruction 36–2803, The Office of the Secretary of the Air Force, Personnel Council approves or disapproves recommendations for Airman's Medals  requiring Secretary of the Air Force final approval and determines upon approval, entitlement to 10 percent increase in retirement pay for the Airman's Medal when awarded to enlisted members for extraordinary heroism.

The Airman's Medal is equivalent to the Army's Soldier's Medal, the Navy and Marine Corps Medal, and the Coast Guard Medal. Additional awards of the Airman's Medal are denoted by oak leaf clusters.

The first recipient of the Airman's Medal was Captain John Burger, U.S. Air Force, who was awarded the medal at MacDill Air Force Base, Florida, on 21 July 1960, for heroism performed on 9 September 1959.

Notable recipients

Paul K. Carlton Jr., for his rescuing several people after American Airlines Flight 77, which crashed into the Pentagon during the September 11 attacks
Adam Kinzinger, for saving the life of a woman who was being attacked by her knife-wielding boyfriend.
Michael Landsberry, for his actions during the 2013 Sparks Middle School shooting, including reasoning with the shooter and protecting several students.
William H. Pitsenbarger for aiding and defending a unit of soldiers pinned down by an enemy assault during the Vietnam War. Before his death he helped save over 60 men in the battle.
Spencer Stone, for disarming a terrorist during the 2015 Thalys train attack.
Col Paul Sowada and Phillip Michael Sowada, who rescued three people from drowning off the beach at Vandenberg Airforce Base on Christmas Day, 1997. The three swimmers were caught in a dangerous rip tide and were being swept out to sea. They are also the only father/son duo to be awarded the medal for the same act of valor.

References

Awards and decorations of the United States Air Force
Awards and decorations of the United States Space Force
Awards established in 1960
Courage awards